Viewer may refer to:

 File viewer, application software that decodes and displays the data in a computer file
 Image viewer, a computer program capable of displaying digital images
 Pocket Viewer, a range of personal digital assistants marketed by Casio
 A person who is engaged in remote viewing
 Slide viewer, a device for viewing slides of reversal film
 Television viewer, television industry term for a person watching television
 ViEWER, a computer program developed for studying visual perception in a virtual 3D environment
 Waveform viewer, a software tool for viewing the signal levels of either a digital or analog circuit design

See also
 View-Master